Magnesium sulfide is an inorganic compound with the formula MgS. It is a white crystalline material but often is encountered in an impure form that is brown and non-crystalline powder. It is generated industrially in the production of metallic iron.

Preparation and general properties
MgS is formed by the reaction of sulfur or hydrogen sulfide with magnesium.  It crystallizes in the rock salt structure as its most stable phase, its zinc blende and wurtzite structures can be prepared by molecular beam epitaxy. The chemical properties of MgS resemble those of related ionic sulfides such as those of sodium, barium, or calcium. It reacts with oxygen to form the corresponding sulfate, magnesium sulfate.  MgS reacts with water to give hydrogen sulfide and magnesium hydroxide.

Applications
In the BOS steelmaking process, sulfur is the first element to be removed. Sulfur is removed from the impure blast furnace iron by the addition of several hundred kilograms of magnesium powder by a lance. Magnesium sulfide is formed, which then floats on the molten iron and is removed.

MgS is a wide band-gap direct semiconductor of interest as a blue-green emitter, a property that has been known since the early 1900s. The wide-band gap property also allows the use of MgS as photo-detector for short wavelength ultraviolet light.

Occurrence
Aside from being a component of some slags, MgS is a rare nonterrestrial mineral niningerite detected in some meteorites.  MgS is also found in the circumstellar envelopes of certain evolved carbon stars, i. e., those with C/O  > 1.

Safety
MgS evolves hydrogen sulfide upon contact with moisture.

References

Sulfides
Magnesium compounds
II-VI semiconductors
Rock salt crystal structure